Mary Henle (July 14, 1913 in Cleveland, Ohio ; † November 17, 2007 in Haverford, Pennsylvania) was an American psychologist who's known most notably for her contributions to Gestalt Psychology and for her involvement in the American Psychological Association. Henle also taught at the New School of Social Research in New York; she was involved in the writing of eight book publications and also helped develop the first psychology laboratory manual in 1948 based on the famous works of Kurt Lewin.

Schooling and life

Mary Henle was born to a Jewish family on July 14, 1913 in Cleveland, Ohio, raised in family that placed a strong emphasis on education. Mary Henle's mother Pearl Hahn Henle was a physician. Pearl's father, without being asked, enrolled Pearl into the study of medicine where she became one of the best physicians of the time. Henle's father Leo immigrated from Stuttgart, Germany to the United States in 1880 at the age of 15. Leo Henle moved to the United States for economic reasons and to pursue his dream of becoming a scientist. Unfortunately he was unable to become a scientist and settled as being a businessman while still continuing his education. Growing up in this academic environment encouraged Henle and her siblings to be strong in their academics. Her brother, Paul, became a professor of philosophy and her sister, Jane, studied archeology.

Mary Henle first attended Smith College in 1930, where she got her bachelor's degree in French followed by her bachelor's degree in psychology in 1934. She then furthered her education in psychology by receiving her master's degree in 1935. While pursuing her master's degree, Henle met with James J. Gibson, Eleanor J. Gibson and Kurt Koffka, all very renowned teachers. Henle's encounter with Koffka aroused her interest in Gestalt Psychology, prompting her to want to know more about the idea. Henle went on to get her Ph.D. at Bryn Mawr College where she was hired as an assistant for Harry Helson. Under Helson's watch she was able to get a solid education in experimental methods. Henle then met Donald W. MacKinnon (who had studied Gestalt psychology in Berlin), this began her interactions with Kurt Lewin and introduced her to his kind of experimental research.

Henle completed her doctorate in 1939, followed by being a research assistant at Swarthmore College to Robert B. MacLeod. During this period there was also an encounter with Wolfgang Köhler. MacLeod, who had studied in Berlin, had invited Wolfgang Köhler to Swarthmore, where he taught until 1955. Henle visited Köhler's seminars and was involved in experimental research with him. This resulted in a close intellectual relationship that lasted till Köhler's death in 1967. In 1941 Henle worked as a professor at the University of Delaware for one year until war efforts opened many jobs for psychologists.

In 1942 Harry Helson called Henle back to Bryn Mawr, where she first taught psychology for graduate students. After two years of teaching, Henle was appointed to the psychological institute of Sarah Lawrence College (1944-1946). In 1946 Solomon Asch invited Henle, on Köhler's recommendation, to become a professor at the New School for Social Research in New York. She remained there for the rest of her career (1946-1983), where she published empirical research and claimed herself as a Gestalt psychologist.

In an autobiographical retrospective Henle paid tribute to the many positive, supportive circumstances and assistantships that she had received for her scientific career. But she had not forgotten the difficulties that she faced as a woman and as a Jew in the academic world of the United States, especially in the 1930s.

Works

The empirical research of Mary Henle was concerned initially (along with Koffka) with perception problems, followed by research in motivational studies and investigations on surrogate activity (1942, 1944). In the tradition of Kurt Lewin, she also studied the psychology of thinking and the possibilities of a phenomenological approach of personality psychology, including questions of rationality and of the relationship between thinking and logic. In 1948, Henle published a handbook with D.W. MacKinnon based on the experimental research of psychodynamics. Later Henle turned to intensively researching the history of ideas in psychology.

Henle was an addition to their own research life striving to make the Gestalt theory of the Berlin school (Wertheimer, Köhler, Koffka et al.) in their authentic basic positions in the United States known to represent and defend their view falsifying interpretations:

In 1961, Henle gave the anthology Documents of Gestalt Psychology out, which after 1938 published collection A Sourcebook of Gestalt Psychology (edited by Willis D. Ellis.). An updated representation of important core positions of Gestalt theory was present: The tape contained a representation of the " Gestalt theory today "by Wolfgang Köhler, the essays from Max Wertheimer about truth, theory of ethics, democracy and freedom. This sourcebook also included a series of essays by Wolfgang Köhler, Rudolf Arnheim, Hans Wallach, Solomon E. Asch, Mary Henle herself and others on key issues of psychological theory, cognitive processes, social psychology and motivation and psychology of expression, art and emotion. In 1970 he published the book in Italian translation.

Ten years later the anthology "Selected Papers of Wolfgang Köhler" (1971), the previously scattered essays Köhler followed the epistemological, psychophysical, cognitive psychological and epistemological positions of Gestalt theory presented new available.

Henle's self-image as a representative and defender of the gestalt theory tradition finally comes perhaps most in the foreground in her 1986 anthology 1879 And All That. Essays in the Theory and History of Psychology. This anthology contains some of her most incisive essays on key issues of Gestalt theory, the concepts, assumptions and terms used in psychology to scrutinize more carefully on their intellectual historical background and its actual meaning.

In the field of psychotherapy theory one of her papers dealt in depth with the late work of Fritz Perls, founder of Gestalt therapy, Gestalt Psychology and Gestalt Therapy (1975). Henle criticizes in this essay (article version of a lecture before the American Psychological Association) the incorrect equating of Gestalt psychology and Gestalt therapy (mainly in the US) (see links). Henle's essay was criticized by some representatives of Gestalt therapy with the argument that Henle unilaterally refers only to Perls' three recent books and ignores the rest of Gestalt therapy literature, and thereby creates a distorting image of Gestalt theraopy. Henle had their choice, however, already justified in their paper so that Perls himself had explained his earlier works in retrospect. In addition, she was not to pass judgment on the psychotherapeutic treatment method, but getting to grips with some meta-theoretical statements of Perls and their relation to Gestalt theory. Therefore, played for their contribution and the fact of the matter at this time is that Gestalt therapy was already no longer identical to the "late" Fritz Perls, but that, Laura Perls' work on the east coast had a significantly different expression.

In German-speaking countries today people base Gestalt Theoretical Psychotherapy on Henle's work, and in particular her work on the Gestalt psychology of substitution and on her phenomenological approach to personality theory, which entails also the basis for dialogue work in psychotherapy.

1978 tribute to Henle in " American Psychologist " in a much-publicized essay that included the bold use Wolfgang Köhler in Nazi Germany against the persecution of his Jewish colleagues: "One Man Against the Nazis - Wolfgang Köhler ".

Mary Henle was President of Division 26 (History of Psychology, 1971-1972) and President of Division 24 (Theoretical and Philosophical Psychology, 1974-1975) of the American Psychological Association (APA). In 1981-1982 she was President of the Eastern Psychology Association. In 1983 she was awarded an honorary doctorate of the New School for Social Research.

Death and legacy
Mary Henle died at the age of 94 in Haverford, Pennsylvania in 2007. Henle's legacy includes writing eight books, her presidency of the American Psychological Association's (APA) Division of the History of Psychology (1971-1972), presidency of the APA's division Philosophical Psychology (1974-1795), and as the president of the Eastern Psychological Association (1981-1982).

References

American women psychologists
20th-century American psychologists
American people of German descent
Smith College alumni
Bryn Mawr College alumni
1913 births
2007 deaths
20th-century American women
21st-century American women